The 2011–12 Luxembourg Cup was the 87th season of Luxembourg's annual cup competition. It began on 28 August 2011 with Round 1 and ended on 26 May 2012 with the Final held at Stade Josy Barthel in Luxembourg City. The winners of the competition qualified for the first qualifying round of the 2012–13 UEFA Europa League. FC Differdange 03 are the defending champions, having won their second cup title last season.

Calendar

Round 1
Fifty teams from Division 2 (IV) and Division 3 (V) entered in this round. Thirty-six of them competed in matches, while the other fourteen teams were awarded a bye to the next round. The games were played on 28 August 2011.

Bye: Alisontia Steinsel, US Berdorf/Consdorf, Blo-Weiss Medernach, FC Brouch, AS Colmar-Berg, Jeunesse Gilsdorf, Jeunesse Sportive Koerich, Les Ardoisiers Perlé, Minière Lasauvage, Racing Troisvierges, Red Star Merl/Belair, US Reisdorf, Rupensia Lusitanos Larochette, Union Remich/Bous

Round 2
The eighteen winners of Round 1 and the fourteen teams that received a bye competed in this round. The games were played on 4 September 2011.

Round 3
The sixteen winners of Round 2 competed in this round, as well as twenty-eight teams from Division 1 (III), which enter the competition in this round. The games were played on 7, 8 and 9 October 2011.

Round 4
The twenty-two winners of Round 3 competed in this round, as well as fourteen teams from the Division of Honour (II), which enter the competition in this round. The games were played on 28, 29 and 30 October and 9 November 2011.

Round 5
The eighteen winners of Round 4 competed in this round, as well as the fourteen teams from the National Division, which enter the competition in this round. The games were played on the 26th and 27 November 2011.

Round 6
The sixteen winners of Round 5 competed in this round. The games were played on 11 April 2012.

Quarterfinals
The eight winners from Round 6 competed in the quarterfinals. They were held on 1 and 2 May 2012.

Semifinals
The four quarterfinal winners competed in the semifinals. They were held on 18 and 20 May 2012.

Final

References

External links
 Official page 
 Private homepage about everything regarding Luxembourg soccer 

Luxembourg Cup seasons
Luxembourg Cup
Cup